The March of Remembrance and Hope (MRH) is a program designed for university and college students of all religions and backgrounds. The program takes place in mid-May, and includes a two-day trip to Germany, followed by a five-day visit to Poland. The international MRH program was founded in 2001 by Dr. David Machlis of the United States and Eli Rubenstein of Canada, both of whom were involved in the March of the Living (MOL) program.

During the trip students visit locations in Germany and Poland related to the Holocaust and other World War II genocides, including the site of the Wannsee Conference, and the former concentration/death camps of Auschwitz, Treblinka and Majdanek.

The purpose of the March of Remembrance and Hope is to teach students of various religious and ethnic backgrounds about the dangers of intolerance through the study of the Holocaust and other World War II genocides, and to promote better relations among people of diverse cultures.

Holocaust survivors also participate in the March of Remembrance and Hope program, sharing their painful memories in the very places in which their stories transpired. During the trip, the students also meet one of the Righteous Among the Nations, and learn of the heroic actions a minority of Europe's population took to resist Nazi tyranny.

Since its inception, students of many diverse religions, backgrounds and ethnicities have taken part in the March of Remembrance and Hope program, including: Buddhist, Christian, Hindu, Jewish, Muslim, Seventh Day Adventist, and many others. In addition, students who come from their own history of persecution (such as survivors of the Rwandan genocide, First Nation students, African Americans, etc.) have also participated in the March of Remembrance and Hope.

From 2007 to 2011 the program was run annually in Canada for Canadian university students, by the Canadian Centre for Diversity, with the cooperation of other organizations. In 2013, CCD transferred the program over to March of the Living Canada. The major funder of the Canadian program is the Azrieli Foundation, founded by Canadian Holocaust survivor, David Azrieli, which is a Canadian philanthropic organization that supports a wide range of initiatives and programs, among which include Holocaust commemoration and education.

The international MRH program is currently on hold, but there are American groups who have traveled with the Canadian delegation, namely Nazareth College and Hobart and William Smith Colleges.  There is also an Austrian program by the same name for university students of diverse backgrounds that travels to Poland earlier during the year, during the March of the Living. In 2010, Nazareth College and Hobart and William Smith Colleges launched their own program called The March: Bearing Witness to Hope - https://web.archive.org/web/20110421035711/http://morah.naz.edu/.

(While there are similarities, MRH and MOL are two different programs. MRH is primarily aimed at university students of diverse backgrounds, does not include a trip to Israel, and its goals are of a universal nature.  MOL is primarily aimed at Jewish high school students, and in addition to universal goals, also includes goals related to Jewish identity and connection to Israel, and usually includes a week long trip to Israel following the Poland portion of the trip.)

Two student organizations in Canada dedicated to teaching tolerance and combating genocide, "Shout Canada" and "’Stand Canada", were founded by students who participated in Marches to Poland. Many of the student leaders and active members of these two organizations are alumni of the March of Remembrance and Hope program.

On January 27, 2007, International Holocaust Remembrance Day, Marie Mirlande Noel, an African American student at the College of St. Elizabeth, and a graduate of the MRH program, addressed the United Nations about her experience on the March of Remembrance and Hope program.

References

External links 
 March of Remembrance and Hope
 March of the Living International
 March of the Living Canada
NMSU students to study the Holocaust in Poland
The March of Remembrance and Hope
Centre students travel to Holocaust sites with student leadership program
Speech by Sally Wasserman: Hidden Child & Holocaust Survivor, Auschwitz Birkenau, May 2, MRH 08
Pinchas: A Holocaust Survivor, Majdanek, MRH 07
Juliet Karugahe, a Rwandan Canadian, speaks on the importance of traveling to Poland on MRH

Holocaust commemoration
Auschwitz concentration camp
Genocide education
Marching